A beta hydroxy acid or β-hydroxy acid (BHA) is an organic compound that contains a carboxylic acid functional group and hydroxy functional group separated by two carbon atoms.  They are closely related to alpha hydroxy acids, in which the two functional groups are separated by one carbon atom.  

In cosmetics, the term beta hydroxy acid refers specifically to salicylic acid, which is used in some "anti-aging" creams and acne treatments. It is used to combat inflammation.

Upon dehydration, beta-hydroxy acids yield an alpha-beta unsaturated acid.

Acidic properties 
Compared to non-hydroxylated carboxylic acids, this group of acids is stronger, although less strong than the alpha hydroxy acids.  Due to the larger distance, the intramolecular hydrogen bridge is less easily formed compared to the alpha hydroxy acids.  The table summarizes some values on the propionic series.

Other beta hydroxy acids include:

 β-Hydroxybutyric acid
 β-Hydroxy β-methylbutyric acid
 Carnitine
 Salicylic acid, a β-hydroxy acid

See also 
 Alpha hydroxy acid
 Omega hydroxy acid

References

 

ar:حمض هيدروكسي